The Novaer T-Xc is a prototype two-seat training aircraft designed and built by in Brazil by Novaer.

Design and development
The T-Xc is a low-wing, cantilever monoplane with retractable tricycle landing gear. It has an enclosed cockpit with two side-by-side configuration seats. It has a single Lycoming IO-540 piston engine in tractor configuration. 

The T-Xc was developed to replace the Neiva Universal in Brazilian Air Force service. It was designed by Joseph Kovacs based on his K-51 aerobatic aircraft project. The prototype first flew from São José dos Campos Airport on 22 August 2014. A proposed development is a four-seat utility aircraft variant.

Variants
T-Xc
Two-seat trainer variant
U-Xc
Four-seat utlity aircraft

References

External links
 

Aircraft first flown in 2014
Low-wing aircraft
2010s Brazilian military trainer aircraft
Single-engined tractor aircraft